Yadgir is a city and the administrative headquarters of Yadgir district in the Indian state of Karnataka.  It is also the administrative headquarters of Yadgir Taluka, one of the six taluks of Yadgir.

Geography

The Bhima River flows through the town.

Overview
Yadgir, historically known as Yetagiri, is dotted with many historical monuments and has a hill fort with three rounds of fortifications. There are three ancient temples, medieval mosques, tanks and wells on top of the hill. A pond, the Sanna Kere is located in the heart of the town.

Demographics
In 2011, Yadgir had a population of 1,172,985 of whom males were 591,104 and females 581,881 respectively. In the 2001 census, Yadgir had a population of 956,180 of whom males were 482,347 and 473,933 were females. Yadgir district's population constitutes 1.92 percent of the total population of Karnataka. In the 2001 census, this figure for Yadgir district was at 1.81 percent.

There was a change of 22.67 percent in the population compared to the population as per the 2001 census. In the census of 2001, Yadgir district recorded an increase of 20.12 percent to its population compared to 1991.

The initial provisional data released by census India 2011 show that the density of Yadgir district for 2011 is 224 people per km2. In 2001, Yadgir district's density was 183 people per km2. Yadgir district covers an area of 5,225 km2.

The average literacy rate of Yadgir in 2011 was 52.36, compared to 39.90 in 2001. Male and female literacy were 63.33 and 41.31 respectively. In the 2001 census, the same figures stood at 51.35 and 28.32. The total number of literates in Yadgir district was 516,940, of whom male and female were 313,797 and 203,143 respectively.

Culture and religion

In Yadgir, there are many spiritual places, e.g., Mayllapur Mallayya. The temple of Shree Kshetra Mouneshwara in Tinthani in Surapura Taluka attracts more than 100,000 devotees every year. In Gurmitkal is situated the famous Mata Manikeshwari temple. The sofi sarmast durga is in the village of Sagar in the Shahapur taluka. The Durga attracts thousands of people in the urus. and Darga Shah Jeewan Shah is located near the Gunj area of Yadgir.

Irrigation
Agriculture in the district is mainly rainfed. The net area irrigated to the net area sown is 38%, which is above the state average of 24%. Krishna, Bhima and Dhoni rivers flow through the district. The irrigation projects in the district are Hattikuni and Soudagar. There are 36 lift irrigation schemes and 445 minor irrigation tanks in the district.

History
The town was part of the empire of the Western Chalukyas from the 10th to the 12th centuries. The name Yadgir (historically Yetagiri) is derived from its early medieval rulers, the 'Yadavas'. Their establishments were on a hill ('giri' in Kannada means hill). Major economic development of the city took place under Philip Meadows Taylor, the British administrator of the principality of Shorapur.

Heritage and tourist sites 
 Yadgir Fort
Lumbini Park Yadgir
Hattikuni Dam
 Shorapur Fort
 Vanadurga Fort

Transport

Yadgir is connected by road and rail.

Railway

Yadgir has a broad gauge railway station, Yadgir railway station, and lies between Mumbai and Chennai.  It comes under the South Central Railway under the Guntakal division. The city is connected to Gulbarga, 78 km. away by rail and 84 km. away by road. From Raichur, its distance is 81 km. It is located between the two districts - Gulbarga and Raichur.

Road

State Highway 15 passes through the city connecting the city to Bijapur and Hyderabad. Important cities connected through buses to the city are Bengaluru, Hubballi, Dharwad, Belagavi, Shirasi, Hosapete, Vasco da Gama in Goa, Hyderabad, Ballari, Raichur.

Industry 
Two rivers flow through the Yadgir district, the Krishna and the Bhima. There is a lot of scope for industrialization.  A sugar factory and a fuel factory, "Core Green", are established near Hiretumkur village. Recently, rich uranium deposits have been found in the Gogi belt, covering the villages of Gogi, Ukkinal & Darshanapur in Shahapur taluk and Thinthini & other places in Surapur taluk. Uranium mined and processed here will be used for defense and power generation purposes..
Near Saidapur in Yadgir taluk there is an industrial area called Kadechur-Badiyal Industrial Area, which estimates at 3000 acres. The Karnataka government has approved proposals by 67 pharmacy companies to set up their units in the Kadechar-Badiyal drug park in the same industrial area. These companies are expected to invest over 2812 crores and generate over 11000 jobs.

Notable people 
 Kollur Mallappa -  Freedom fighter and Indian Politician.
Vishwanath Reddy Mudnal -  Freedom fighter and Indian Politician.
Vidyadhar Guruji Sayanna -  Freedom fighter and Indian Politician.
 Channareddy Patil Tunnur - Indian Politician.
Baburao Chinchansur - Indian Politician.
 Veer Basawanthreddy Mudnal - Doctor and Indian Politician.
Sharanabasappa Darshanapur - Indian Politician.
Raju Gowda - Indian Politician.
 Venkatreddy Mudnal - Indian Politician.
Nagangouda Kandkur - Indian Politician.
Rafeeq Saudagar - Indian Urdu poet.
Basanagoud police patil - Kannada poet and sportsman.

Impact due to climate change 
4000 hectares of land was destroyed due to rains in Yadgir.

References

External links

Cities and towns in Yadgir district
Forts in Karnataka
Buildings and structures in Yadgir district
Taluks in Yadgiri district